Stockholm is a town in Grant County, South Dakota, United States. The population was 102 at the 2020 census.

Stockholm was laid out in 1896, and named after the capital city of Sweden, the native land of a large share of the first settlers.

Geography

Stockholm is located at  (45.100101, -96.800232).

Stockholm has been assigned the ZIP code 57264 and the FIPS place code 61740.

Demographics

2010 census
As of the census of 2010, there were 108 people, 48 households, and 27 families residing in the town. The racial makeup of the town was 91.7% White, 2.8% Native American, 0.9% from other races, and 4.6% from two or more races. Hispanic or Latino of any race were 0.9% of the population.

There were 48 households, of which 27.1% had children under the age of 18 living with them, 43.8% were married couples living together, 4.2% had a female householder with no husband present, 8.3% had a male householder with no wife present, and 43.8% were non-families. 33.3% of all households were made up of individuals, and 12.5% had someone living alone who was 65 years of age or older. The average household size was 2.25 and the average family size was 2.89.

The median age in the town was 41.5 years. 21.3% of residents were under the age of 18; 9.2% were between the ages of 18 and 24; 22.2% were from 25 to 44; 27.8% were from 45 to 64; and 19.4% were 65 years of age or older. The gender makeup of the town was 59.3% male and 40.7% female.

2000 census
As of the census of 2000, there were 105 people, 48 households, and 28 families residing in the town. The population density was 239.3 people per square mile (92.1/km2). There were 57 housing units at an average density of 129.9 per square mile (50.0/km2). The racial makeup of the town was 98.10% White, 0.95% Native American, and 0.95% from two or more races.

There were 48 households, out of which 20.8% had children under the age of 18 living with them, 52.1% were married couples living together, 2.1% had a female householder with no husband present, and 39.6% were non-families. 37.5% of all households were made up of individuals, and 29.2% had someone living alone who was 65 years of age or older. The average household size was 2.19 and the average family size was 2.90.

In the town, the population was spread out, with 18.1% under the age of 18, 8.6% from 18 to 24, 24.8% from 25 to 44, 21.9% from 45 to 64, and 26.7% who were 65 years of age or older. The median age was 44 years. For every 100 females, there were 118.8 males. For every 100 females age 18 and over, there were 104.8 males.

The median income for a household in the town was $39,375, and the median income for a family was $40,625. Males had a median income of $22,143 versus $31,250 for females. The per capita income for the town was $17,174. None of the population or families were below the poverty line.

References

Towns in Grant County, South Dakota
Towns in South Dakota